Munkácsy, named after Mihály Munkácsy, is a crater on Mercury. Munkácsy originally had a double-ring basin structure, but most of the inner ring was buried when the basin was flooded with volcanic lava. Only a few remnants of the ring poke up through the lava, although low ridges in the lava seem to trace out much of the rest of the ring's circumference.

The name of the crater was adopted by the International Astronomical Union in 2009. Munkácsy is named for the Hungarian painter Mihály Munkácsy.

The crater Fonteyn is to the northwest of Munkácsy, and the crater Raditladi is to the northeast.

References

Impact craters on Mercury